Acacia citrinoviridis, commonly known as black mulga, river jam, milhan or wantan, is a tree  in the family Fabaceae that is native to western Australia.

Description
It usually has just one trunk and has grey fissured bark on the trunk and larger branches. Like most Acacia species, it has phyllodes rather than true leaves. The flowers are yellow, and held in cylindrical clusters. From a distance black mulga is similar to mulga but it can be distinguished by its dark bark.

Distribution
The tree is endemic to the Pilbara and northern parts of the Mid West regions of Western Australia, it occurs along creeks and rivers in the semi-arid land north of Carnarvon and Meekatharra where it is often situated in rocky river and creek beds, on stony plains and on rocky ridges growing in stony loam or clay loam, alluvium or red sandy soils.

See also
List of Acacia species

References

citrinoviridis
Fabales of Australia
Acacias of Western Australia
Plants described in 1976
Taxa named by Mary Tindale
Taxa named by Bruce Maslin